Maariv is a Hebrew-language daily newspaper published in Israel.

From Sunday to Thursday, it is printed under the Ma'ariv Hashavu'a brand, while the weekend edition that is out on Friday is called Ma'ariv SofHashavu'a. A daily, abridged version of the newspaper, called Ma'ariv Haboker, is distributed for free every morning during the week. Ma'ariv Haboker is the fourth Israeli newspaper in readership (after Israel HaYom, Yedioth Ahronoth and Haaretz).

Since May 2014, Maarivs co-editors in chief are Doron Cohen and Golan Bar-Yosef. Apart from the daily newspaper and its supplements, Maariv has a chain of local newspapers with a national scale distribution and magazines division.

History
Maariv was founded in 1948 by former Yediot Aharonot journalists led by Dr. Ezriel Carlebach, who became Maariv's first editor-in-chief. It was the most widely read newspaper in Israel in its first twenty years.

For many years, the Nimrodi family held a controlling stake in Maariv, and Yaakov Nimrodi served as its chairman. In March 2010, Zaki Rakib bought a 50% share from Israel Land Development Company and Ofer Nimrodi, bringing new energy and a much needed cash infusion to the newspaper, which had been losing millions of NIS a year since 2004. Rakib became the new chairman.

However, it was announced in March 2011 that Nochi Dankner was to take control of Maariv through his Discount Investment. On 25 March, Discount transferred 20 million NIS to the struggling firm. On 11 September, Maarivs chairman Dani Yakobi issued a statement saying that he would sell the newspaper's printing equipment to be able to pay September salaries. On 7 September, Globes announced that Dankner had reached an agreement with Shlomo Ben-Zvi, publisher of Makor Rishon, to buy out the newspaper. However, the deal faltered, and Dankner turned to the court on 23 September for a stay of proceedings' process. The court appointed a trustee, Shlomo Nass, who ran the newspaper and searched for a buyer. During the following weeks the workers waged a campaign against IDB and Dankner, demanding he honor his obligations to them and pay their salaries, pensions and severance packages in full.

In early November the trustee sold the newspaper to Ben Zvi without the debts or the workers. Ben Zvi kept a fraction of the journalists and commenced a partial convergence process between Maariv and Makor Rishon under his company, Makor Rishon Hatzofe Hameuchad.

As of January 2013, the company Maariv Modiin Ltd. no longer operates Maariv, and until its scheduled closure it will be operated by the court appointed trustee.

In March 2014, after a long struggle to stabilize the company, Ben Zvi turned to the municipal Jerusalem court for a stay of proceedings' process. Maariv closed most of its departments and published only a thin version, until the court appointed trustee could find a new owner. In May 2014 the brand was purchased by Eli Azur, who has holdings in a number of media outlets in Israel, including The Jerusalem Post, Sport1, Israel Post and 103FM radio station. A few days after the deal was approved, Azur relaunched the daily newspaper as Maariv-Hashavua, and a weekend edition called Maariv-Sofhashavua, which is an amalgamation of Maariv and the group's weekend magazine Sofhashavua.

Political orientation
Maariv, associated with Israel's political center, was critical of Benjamin Netanyahu's center-right government.

Moshe Arens, in a Haaretz opinion piece penned in 2012, wrote that the owner of Maariv had resolved a few years earlier to steer the newspaper leftward, "forsaking the right-wing readership that was loyal to it for years".

Circulation
In a TGI survey for the first half of 2012, Maarivs market share was 11.9 percent. Until 2013 Maariv owned a printing house, which was sold to the newspaper Yisrael Hayom to cover the newspaper's big debts. Since then Maariv has outsourced the printing operations to other printing houses.

Supplements
 Weekdays:
 Hamagazine – daily magazine, including culture and entertainment, crosswords, television and radio listings; used to include opinions
 Asakim – financial section
 Sport section
 Tuesday
 Signon – home magazine
 Wednesday
 Signon – fashion magazine
 Friday
 Musafshabat – in-depth political analysis and commentary
 Sofshavua – weekend magazine
 Journal – culture and entertainment, TV and radio listings
 Asakim – financial magazine
 At – YOU, women's magazine
 A local affiliated weekly newspaper, depending on the region

Notable journalists

Present
 Menachem Ben – literature critic, publicist
 Yehonatan Geffen – columnist
 Mordechai Haimovich – magazine writer
 Tzipi Hotovely – columnist
 Kalman Liebskind – journalist and columnist
 Avi Ratzon – sport commentator
 Ruvik Rosenthal – Hebrew language columnist
 Erel Segal – columnist
 Ben-Dror Yemini – publicist (politics)
 Ben Caspit - 
journalist and columnist

Past 

 Dahn Ben Amotz – humor, culture, gossip (deceased)
 Kobi Arieli – satirist
 Ben Caspit – political and diplomatic analyst
 Daniel Dagan - political correspondent 
 Amnon Dankner – chief editor
 Jacob Farkas ("Ze'ev") – cartoonist (deceased)
 Kariel Gardosh ("Dosh") – cartoonist, creator of the "Srulik" ("little Israel") character (deceased)
 Dudu Geva – humor and satire (deceased)
 Jacky Hugi – Arab and Middle East correspondent
 Ephraim Kishon – humor and satire (deceased)
 Tommy Lapid – editor, turned to politics and returned to the paper as a publicist (deceased)
 Ron Maiberg – columnist
 Dan Margalit – political columnist
 Ofer Shelach – political, military and diplomatic analyst, sport commentator
 Meir Shnitzer – TV and film critic

See also
List of newspapers in Israel

References

External links
 
Maariv Holdings Ltd. – BusinessWeek
Online, searchable Maariv editions from the Historical Jewish Press
Maariv Online is the newspaper's news website. it includes updates from most of the other media outlets owned by the group, such as The Jerusalem Post, Sport 1,2 Radio 103FM and 99FM.

Daily newspapers published in Israel
Hebrew-language newspapers
Publications established in 1948
Israeli brands
Mass media in Tel Aviv
1948 establishments in Israel